Sangdeh or Sang Deh or Sang-i-Deh or Sangedeh may refer to:
 Sangdeh, Gilan
 Sangdeh, Hamadan
 Sang Deh, Mazandaran